Alexandra Close is an American journalist and the founder of Ethnic Media Services. She was the executive director of Pacific News Service from 1974 to 2017 and of New America Media from 1996 to 2017.

Early life and education  
Close received her B.A from the University of California, Berkeley in 1964.

Career 
Close worked as the China editor in Hong Kong for the Far Eastern Economic Review in the mid-1960s. Upon her return to the U.S. she co-founded Oakland-based newspaper The Flatlands. She was also a weekly commentator for Morning Edition from 1984 to 1985.

In 1991, she founded Yo! Youth Outlook, a monthly magazine of youth writing and art, and in 1996, she co-founded The Beat Within, a weekly journal written by incarcerated youth.

She served as the executive director of Pacific News Service from 1974 to the publication's closing in 2017. In 1996, she founded New America Media, which involved up to 3,000 ethnic news organizations in California, and served as its executive director until its closure in 2017.

In 2018, Close founded Ethnic Media Services, a non-profit agency focused on developing cross-cultural journalism and marketing projects to promote inclusive public discourse.

Close was a co-producer for the film Breathing Lessons: The Life and Work of Mark O'Brien, which won the Academy Award for Best Documentary (Short Subject) in 1996.

Personal life 
Close was married to the historian and Asian affairs scholar Franz Schurmann from 1968 until his death in 2010.

Awards
2011 George Polk Award for Career Achievement 
2008 Ashoka Fellowship 
2006 Purpose Prize Fellowship
1995 MacArthur Fellows Program

Works
"Ben Hur" Vs. "Titanic" -- Nature Replaced God in Film That Speaks to Environmental Age, JINN, 03-26-98
"Fear and uncertainty in the era of change", National Civic Review, Volume 98 Issue 3, Pages 46 – 47

References

External links
"SUNDAY INTERVIEW -- Sandy Close", The San Francisco Chronicle, July 16, 1995
"SANDY CLOSE", NewsHour, PBS, October 2002
"AN INTERVIEW WITH SANDY CLOSE", Chava Films, Martha Wallner

American media executives
University of California, Berkeley alumni
MacArthur Fellows
Year of birth missing (living people)
Living people
American women journalists
21st-century American women